Arkansas Highway 297 is the name for two different state highways, both in Mississippi County.

Northern section

The northern section of Highway 297 begins in West Ridge at an intersection with Highway 140. The eastern end is near a private airstrip.

Major intersections

Southern section

The southern section of Highway 297 is a spur route which connects Dyess to the highway system.  It begins at Highway 14 north of Dyess and heads south.  Near its halfway point, the highway crosses the Tyronza River and then passes through the center of Dyess.  One half-mile (0.8 km) south of the town center, the designation ends where the pavement ends.  It continues south as Mississippi County Road 139.

Major intersections

References

297
Transportation in Mississippi County, Arkansas